The 2007 Hopman Cup (also known as the Hyundai Hopman Cup for sponsorship reasons) corresponds to the 19th edition of the Hopman Cup tournament between nations in men's and women's tennis. Eight teams participated in the World Group with one qualifier from the Asian region. The first matches were held on 30 December 2006 and the final took place on 5 January 2007 at the Burswood Entertainment Complex, Perth, Western Australia.

Teams

Seeds
 – Nadia Petrova and Dmitry Tursunov (champions)
 – Anabel Medina Garrigues and Tommy Robredo (finalists)
 – Lucie Šafářová and Tomáš Berdych
 – Ashley Harkleroad and Mardy Fish

Unseeded
 – Alicia Molik and Mark Philippoussis1
 – Sanja Ančić and Mario Ančić
 – Tatiana Golovin and Jérôme Haehnel
 – Sania Mirza and Rohan Bopanna

1Due to injury Mark Philippoussis was unable to play Australia's last tie against the USA. He was replaced by Nathan Healey.

Group A

Standings

Australia vs. Russia

France vs. United States

Russia vs. United States

France vs. Australia

France vs. Russia

Australia vs. United States

Group B

Standings

India vs. Czech Republic

Spain vs. Croatia

Spain vs. Czech Republic

Croatia vs. India

Spain vs. India

Czech Republic vs. Croatia

Final

Russia vs. Spain

External links

2007 Hopman Cup Article from the ITF

Hopman Cup
Hopman Cup
2007